Canterbury United Pride is a semi-professional women's association football team based in Christchurch, New Zealand. The team was established in 2002 as Mainland Pride by Mainland Football as the regional federation's representative in the National Women's League. As such, the teams plays matches at English Park, a 3,000 capacity venue and the headquarters of Mainland Football.

Mainland Pride's first achievement was in their 2011–12 season, with the team finishing first in the National Women's League Southern Conference. However, they didn't manage to advance past the semi-finals of the play-offs, after a 1–6 defeat to Waikato-Bay of Plenty. The team secured their first title in 2013 after defeating Northern Football Federation 4–2 in the final of the National Women's League. In 2014 Pride finished the regular season in first position and were again crowned champions after winning the National Women's League final 3–1 against New Zealand Football Development.

In the 2016 season of the National Women's League, Canterbury United Pride changed their name from Mainland Pride.

Honours
National Women's League
Champions (3): 2013, 2014, 2016

References

External links
 

2002 establishments in New Zealand
Association football clubs established in 2002
Sport in Canterbury, New Zealand
Association football clubs in Christchurch
Women's association football clubs in New Zealand